The Montgomery County School District was a public school district with its headquarters in Winona, Mississippi.

The district served rural areas of Montgomery County, Mississippi (USA), including the towns of Duck Hill and Kilmichael. Small pieces of the Winona city limits extended into the district.

Effective July 1, 2018 the Montgomery County and Winona Separate School District consolidated into the Winona-Montgomery Consolidated School District. The consolidation was mandated by the Mississippi state government.

History

At one time the district allowed students residing there to transfer to other nearby school districts, including the Winona schools, schools in Grenada, and schools in French Camp. In 2001 the district ended that policy.

The district attempted to stop the merger with Winona schools with a restraining order in 2017.

Schools
At the time of closing:
Montgomery County High School - Kilmichael
Montgomery County Elementary School - Kilmichael - Formerly Kilmichael Elementary School
At one time Kilmichael Elementary had 1,000 students. In 2001 it had 366 students.

Previous schools:
 Duck Hill High School - Duck Hill
 Duck Hill Elementary School - Duck Hill
 Circa 2001 it had around 100 students. At that time school district officials were considering closing it and moving the students to Kilmichael Elementary. Duck Hill residents stated opposition to the closure proposals.

Demographics

2006-07 school year
There were a total of 458 students enrolled in the Montgomery County School District during the 2006-2007 school year. The gender makeup of the district was 48% female and 52% male. The racial makeup of the district was 90.17% African American, 8.52% White, 1.09% Hispanic, and 0.22% Asian. 76.7% of the district's students were eligible to receive free lunch.

Previous school years

Accountability statistics

See also
List of school districts in Mississippi

References

External links

Map of Montgomery County, MS school districts, 2010 - U.S. Census Bureau

Education in Montgomery County, Mississippi
Former school districts in Mississippi
School districts disestablished in 2018
2018 disestablishments in Mississippi